The year 1988 in archaeology involved some significant events.

Explorations

Excavations
 Excavations at Troy begin by team from the University of Tübingen and the University of Cincinnati under the direction of Professor Manfred Korfmann.
 The Kent Archaeological Rescue Unit at Crofton Roman Villa.
 Excavation of Ancient Greek shipwreck at Ma'agan Michael.

Publications
 Peter Harbison - Pre-Christian Ireland: from the first settlers to the early Celts.

Finds
 Earrings, crown and rosettes from the tomb of Queen Yabay in Kalhu (modern Nimrud, Iraq) are discovered. They were made in the late 8th century BC. They are displayed at Iraq Museum, Baghdad.
 Discovery of the Palatine wall in Rome.
 Uncovering of a Christian basilica of c. 300 CE at Aqaba in Jordan.
 Discovery of a shipwreck of 500–460 BC off Gela (Sicily).
 Accidental discovery of the remains of a Roman amphitheatre in the City of London in excavation of foundations of new Guildhall Art Gallery.
 Discovery of the Semliki harpoon in the Katanda Territory of the Democratic Republic of Congo.

Births
Lisa Lodwick, British archaeologist (d. 2022)

Deaths
 January 8 - Einar Gjerstad, Swedish archaeologist of the Mediterranean (b. 1897).
 December 25 - W. F. Grimes, Welsh archaeologist (b. 1905).

References

Archaeology
Archaeology
Archaeology by year